Local elections were held in Serbia over two rounds on 3 November and 17 November 1996, concurrently with the 1996 Vojvodina provincial election; the first day of voting also coincided with the 1996 Yugoslavian parliamentary election and the 1996 Montenegrin parliamentary election. This was the third local electoral cycle held while Serbia was a member of the Federal Republic of Yugoslavia and the last time that Serbia oversaw local elections throughout Kosovo and Metohija until its parallel elections in 2008.

Delegates to city and municipal assemblies were elected in single-member constituencies; if no candidate secured a majority in the first round of voting, the top two candidates would face each other in a runoff vote in the second round.

Campaign and aftermath
The elections took place during the time of Slobodan Milošević's authoritarian rule as president of Serbia. In most major jurisdictions, Milošević's Socialist Party of Serbia (Socijalistička partija Srbije, SPS) ran in an alliance with the Yugoslav Left (Jugoslovenska Levica, JUL) and New Democracy (Nova demokratija, ND).

The main opposition grouping was the Zajedno (English: Together) alliance, which was officially formed in September 1996 by the Democratic Party (Demokratska stranka, DS), the Serbian Renewal Movement (Srpski pokret obnove, SPO), and the Civic Alliance of Serbia (Građanski savez Srbije, GSS). The Democratic Party of Serbia (Demokratska stranka Srbije, DSS) contested the Yugoslavian parliamentary election as part of Zajedno. For the local elections, it took part in the Zajedno alliance in some jurisdictions (including Kragujevac, Pančevo, Smederevo, and Čačak), and contested other areas (including Belgrade) on its own.

The far-right Serbian Radical Party (Srpska radikalna stranka, SRS) contested the election on its own, directing its attacks on both Milošević and Zajedno.

The election results were marked by weeks of controversy, particularly in major urban centres such as the capital Belgrade and Niš. Zajedno claimed victory in several of these communities, but the SPS did not accept defeat, and the local election commissions (which were often controlled by allies of Milošević) initially refused to certify the opposition victories. In Belgrade, the election commission invalidated the results in thirty-three constituencies won by Zajedno and called a third round of voting for 27 November. The Zajedno parties boycotted the third round, charging that it was an abuse of process. These events led to the 1996–1997 protests in Serbia, in which student and opposition groups held a series of non-violent street rallies against the Milošević government.

The Milošević government held a counter-rally in Belgrade on 24 December 1996, which drew only sixty thousand attendees (many of whom had been brought in from rural areas) against three hundred thousand opposition protesters. Three days later, a delegation from the Organization for Security and Co-operation in Europe (OSCE) ruled that the opposition had indeed won several of the contested areas, including Belgrade, Niš, Pančevo, and Zrenjanin. The Serbian government began to soften its position after this time, accepting the opposition's victory in Niš on 8 January 1997. The Belgrade election commission announced on 17 January that Zajedno had won the elections; the government initially refused to accept this ruling, but on 13 February (following police attacks on the demonstrators that were condemned internationally) the Serbian parliament approved a lex specialis that affirmed almost all of the victories claimed by Zajedno. The protests wound down after this time, and the Zajedno coalition took power in Belgrade and several other cities.

Ultimately, the parties in Zajedno were not able to remain united at the republic level, and the coalition fell apart in Belgrade before the year was over. In some jurisdictions, including Novi Sad, the parties were able to maintain their alliance until the next local election cycle in 2000.

Results
Note: Vote totals and percentages refer to the results in the first round of voting.

Belgrade
Elections were held at the city level and in all of Belgrade's constituent municipalities. The Zajedno alliance won a majority victory in the city, as well as winning control of most municipal assemblies. The Socialists won a smaller number of victories, mostly in the city's outer suburbs, while the Radicals won control of Zemun.

City of Belgrade
Results of the election for the City Assembly of Belgrade:

(Note: Only parties or alliances that won representation in the assembly are listed. The election for the City Assembly of Belgrade was the only election for which results were not provided in the Serbian government's report of the 1996 cycle.)

DS leader Zoran Đinđić was chosen as mayor on 21 February 1997, by a vote of sixty-eight to twenty-four among the city assembly's delegates. There were sixteen abstentions and one delegate was absent. Zajedno gained another seat shortly after the election, when DSS delegate Aleksandra Joksimović joined the DS.

The SPO left the Zajedno alliance later in the year. Đinđić was dismissed as mayor on 30 September 1997, via an SPO motion that was supported by the SPS and SRS. Sixty-seven of the sixty-eight delegates present voted for Đinđić 's dismissal; the other delegate abstained. The non-SPO members of Zajedno boycotted this sitting of the assembly on the grounds that it had been improperly constituted. Milan Božić of the SPO became the city's acting mayor, and SPO members came to hold all of the major positions in the city government with the informal support of the SPS and SRS. Vojislav Mihailović, also of the SPO, was selected as the city's new mayor in January 1999.

Municipalities of Belgrade

Barajevo
Results of the election for the Municipal Assembly of Barajevo:

Milan Damnjanović of the Socialist Party was chosen as mayor after the election.

Čukarica
Results of the election for the Municipal Assembly of Čukarica:

Zoran Alimpić of the Democratic Party was chosen as mayor after the election.

Grocka
Results of the election for the Municipal Assembly of Grocka:

Incumbent mayor Milan Janković of the Socialist Party was confirmed for another term in office after the election.

Lazarevac
Results of the election for the Municipal Assembly of Lazarevac:

Živko Živković of the Socialist Party was chosen as mayor after the election.

Mladenovac
Results of the election for the Municipal Assembly of Mladenovac:

Predrag Čokić of Zajedno was chosen as mayor after the election, by a vote of 28 to 27. This was one of two municipalities where the lex specialis did not recognize a victory claimed by Zajedno, although the coalition managed to form government in any event.

New Belgrade
Results of the election for the Municipal Assembly of New Belgrade:

Incumbent mayor Čedomir Ždrnja of the Socialist Party was confirmed for another term in office after the election. This was one of two municipalities where the lex specialis did not recognize a victory claimed by Zajedno.

Obrenovac
Results of the election for the Municipal Assembly of Obrenovac:

Palilula
Results of the election for the Municipal Assembly of Palilula:

Gordana Tomić of the Democratic Party was chosen as mayor after the election.

Rakovica
Results of the election for the Municipal Assembly of Rakovica:

Predrag Dokmanović of the Serbian Renewal Movement was chosen as mayor after the election.

Savski Venac
Results of the election for the Municipal Assembly of Savski Venac:

Zdravko Krstić of the Serbian Renewal Movement was chosen as mayor after the election.

Sopot
Results of the election for the Municipal Assembly of Sopot:

Incumbent mayor Živorad Milosavljević of the Socialist Party was confirmed for another term in office after the election.

Stari Grad
Results of the election for the Municipal Assembly of Stari Grad:

Incumbent mayor Jovan Kažić of the Serbian Renewal Movement was confirmed for another term in office after the election.

Voždovac
Results of the election for the Municipal Assembly of Voždovac:

Nebojša Atanacković of the Serbian Renewal Movement was chosen as mayor after the election.

Vračar
Results of the election for the Municipal Assembly of Vračar:

Milena Milošević of the Democratic Party was chosen as mayor after the election.

Zemun
Results of the election for the Municipal Assembly of Zemun:

Radical Party leader Vojislav Šešelj was chosen as mayor after the election. He was replaced in 1998 by Stevo Dragišić.

Zvezdara
Results of the election for the Municipal Assembly of Zvezdara:

Vučeta Mandić of Zajedno was chosen as mayor after the election.

Vojvodina

South Bačka District
Elections were held in all twelve municipalities of the South Bačka District. The Zajedno alliance won a convincing victory in Novi Sad, while the Socialist Party and Yugoslav Left won a number of the neighbouring jurisdictions. Independent candidates won a majority of seats in Bački Petrovac, and the Radical Party won the greatest number of seats in Temerin.

Novi Sad
Results of the election for the Municipal Assembly of Novi Sad:

Mihajlo Svilar of the Serbian Renewal Movement was chosen as mayor after the election. He was replaced on 18 June 1997 by fellow SPO member Stevan Vrbaški.

Gordana Čomić of the Democratic Party served on Novi Sad's executive committee in 1997.

Bač
Results of the election for the Municipal Assembly of Bač:

Bačka Palanka
Results of the election for the Municipal Assembly of Bačka Palanka:

Bački Petrovac
Results of the election for the Municipal Assembly of Bački Petrovac:

Incumbent mayor Juraj Červenak was confirmed for another term in office after the election.

Bečej
Results of the election for the Municipal Assembly of Bečej:

Incumbent mayor Endre Husag of the Alliance of Vojvodina Hungarians was confirmed for another term in office after the election.

Beočin
Results of the election for the Municipal Assembly of Beočin:

Srbobran
Results of the election for the Municipal Assembly of Srbobran:

Sremski Karlovci
Results of the election for the Municipal Assembly of Sremski Karlovci:

Temerin
Results of the election for the Municipal Assembly of Temerin:

Titel
Results of the election for the Municipal Assembly of Titel:

Vrbas
Results of the election for the Municipal Assembly of Vrbas:

Žabalj
Results of the election for the Municipal Assembly of Žabalj:

Đorđe Đukić of the Democratic Party was chosen as mayor after the election.

Central Serbia (excluding Belgrade)

Nišava District
Local elections were held in the one city (Niš) and the six other municipalities of the Nišava District. Following the opposition protests, it was recognized that the Zajedno alliance won a majority of seats in the election for the City Assembly of Niš. The Socialist Party won majority victories in all six of the smaller communities.

Niš
Results of the election for the City Assembly of Niš:

Zoran Živković of the Democratic Party was chosen as mayor after the election. Zoran Krasić ran as a Radical Party candidate and was the party's presumptive nominee for mayor; he was not elected to the assembly.

Aleksinac
Results of the election for the Municipal Assembly of Aleksinac:

Slobodan Stevanović of the Socialist Party served as mayor after the election.

Doljevac
Results of the election for the Municipal Assembly of Doljevac:

Incumbent mayor Aleksandar Cvetković of the Socialist Party was confirmed for another term in office after the election.

Gadžin Han
Results of the election for the Municipal Assembly of Gadžin Han:

Incumbent mayor Siniša Stamenković of the Socialist Party was confirmed for another term in office after the election.

Merošina
Results of the election for the Municipal Assembly of Merošina:

Ražanj
Results of the election for the Municipal Assembly of Ražanj:

Svrljig
Results of the election for the Municipal Assembly of Svrljig:

Šumadija District
Elections were held in all seven municipalities of the Šumadija District. The Zajedno coalition won in the city of Kragujevac and also in the municipality of Lapovo. The Socialist Party won majority victories in four of the other municipalities; in Batočina, the Yugoslav Left formed a minority administration with the support of the Socialists and some independent delegates.

Kragujevac
Results of the election for the City Assembly of Kragujevac:

The Milošević government did not contest the opposition's victory in Kragujevac. Veroljub Stevanović of the Serbian Renewal Movement became mayor after the election. The Zajedno government in the city remained together for the full term that followed.

Aranđelovac
Results of the election for the Municipal Assembly of Aranđelovac:

Batočina
Results of the election for the Municipal Assembly of Batočina:

Slobodan Živulović of the Yugoslav Left served as mayor after the election.

Knić
Results of the election for the Municipal Assembly of Knić:

Lapovo
Results of the election for the Municipal Assembly of Lapovo:

Dragan Zlatković of the Serbian Renewal Movement served as mayor after the election. Future parliamentarian Mirko Čikiriz, also of the Serbian Renewal Movement, served as secretary of the municipal assembly and the municipal administration in 1997–98.

Rača
Results of the election for the Municipal Assembly of Rača:

Topola
Results of the election for the Municipal Assembly of Topola:

Incumbent mayor Žarko Jovanović of the Socialist Party of Serbia was confirmed for another term in office after the election.

Kosovo and Metohija

The elections in Kosovo and Metohija were largely boycotted by members of the Kosovo Albanian community, which had set up parallel governing structures in the province.

Kosovska Mitrovica District
Local elections were held in all six municipalities of the Kosovska Mitrovica District.  The Socialist Party won majority victories in all jurisdictions except Zvečan, where no party won a majority and an incumbent from the opposition was confirmed in office for another term.

Kosovska Mitrovica
Results of the election for the Municipal Assembly of Kosovska Mitrovica:

Following the Kosovo War, Kosovska Mitrovica became divided between the predominantly Serb north and the predominantly Albanian south. Nikola Radović, presumably of the Socialist Party, served as mayor of the northern section from 1999 to 2002 (his mandate having been extended). Online sources due not clarify if he was also the mayor of a united Kosovska Mitrovica prior to the war. Bajram Rexhepi served as mayor of the southern half of the city, which was beyond the control of the Serbian authorities.

Leposavić
Results of the election for the Municipal Assembly of Leposavić:

Dragan Jablanović of the Socialist Party served as mayor after the election.

Srbica
Results of the election for the Municipal Assembly of Srbica:

Slavica Jeradić of the Socialist Party served as president of the assembly's executive board.

Following the Kosovo War, control of the municipality passed out of the hands of the Serbian authorities. An August 2000 report in the Christian Science Monitor indicated that former Kosovo Liberation Army (KLA) soldiers affiliated with the Democratic Party of Kosovo exercised "virtual complete control." Ramadan Gashi served as mayor of a provisional authority.

Vučitrn
Results of the election for the Municipal Assembly of Vučitrn:

Slobodan Doknić, presumably of the Socialist Party, served as mayor after the election. 

Following the Kosovo War, control of the municipality passed out of the hands of the Serbian authorities. Xhemalj Pllani of the Party for the Democratic Progress of Kosovo (later the Democratic Party of Kosovo) became a provisional mayor in the municipality; his position was later formalized by the United Nations Interim Administration Mission in Kosovo (UNMIK).

Zubin Potok
Results of the election for the Municipal Assembly of Zubin Potok:

Srđan Vulović of the Socialist Party of Serbia served as mayor during the term that followed.

Zvečan
Results of the election for the Municipal Assembly of Zvečan:

Incumbent mayor Desimir Petković was confirmed for another term in office after the election. He was removed from office in June 2000 and replaced by Miomira Ignjatović.

References

Local elections in Serbia
1996 elections in Yugoslavia
1996 elections in Serbia
Elections in Serbia and Montenegro
November 1996 events in Europe